"Feel Me" is a song by English synth-pop duo Blancmange, released on 23 July 1982 as the second single from their debut studio album Happy Families (1982). It was written by Neil Arthur and Stephen Luscombe, and produced by Mike Howlett. "Feel Me" reached No. 46 in the UK and remained on the charts for five weeks.

Speaking to The Spill Magazine in 2018, Arthur recalled of the song's writing: "Stephen came in with a groove — my input was the words and the topline melody."

Critical reception
Upon release, Billboard picked the single as a "recommended" single under the "Dance/Disco" category. Keyboard wrote: "Much of Luscombe's work is sustained lines with muted tone colors, but on "Feel Me" he does a gutty synth bass figure."

In a retrospective review of Happy Families (1982), Bill Cassel of AllMusic considered "Feel Me" as one of the album's highlights. Ira Robbins of Trouser Press felt the song "suffer[s] from extreme monochromatic tediousness". John Bergstrom of PopMatters stated: "The nervous "I Can't Explain", and twisted electro-funk love song "Feel Me" still sound taut and sharp, and Arthur and Luscombe never bettered them." John Doran of The Quietus commented in a review of The Very Best of Blancmange (2012): "There is a marginally darker feel to other early singles with lurching, belligerent electronic funk pop evident on "Feel Me" and "I Can't Explain"."

Track listing
7-inch single
 "Feel Me" – 5:05
 "Feel Me" (Instrumental) – 5:04

7-inch single (Philippines release)
 "Feel Me" – 5:03
 "God's Kitchen" – 2:51

12-inch single
 "Feel Me (Extended Version)" – 7:03
 "Feel Me (Instrumental)" – 5:08

Personnel
Blancmange
 Neil Arthur – lead vocals
 Stephen Luscombe – keyboards, synthesizers

Additional personnel
 Madeline Bell, Stevie Lange – backing vocals
 David Rhodes – guitar
 Mike Howlett – producer
 Tim Young – mastering

Charts

References

External links

1982 songs
1982 singles
Blancmange (band) songs
London Records singles
Songs written by Neil Arthur
Songs written by Stephen Luscombe
Song recordings produced by Mike Howlett